The Quack was an Australian bred Thoroughbred racehorse that won the 1872 Melbourne Cup.

The Quack was the half brother of the 1870 Melbourne Cup winner Nimblefoot, with both horses being from the same broodmare in Quickstep (AUS).In 1873 The Quack defeated Nimblefoot in the Govenors Plate at Flemington. He also won the Bendigo Cup in 1872.

The Quack was the fourth and final success in the Melbourne Cup for owner and trainer John Tait.

References

Melbourne Cup winners
1866 racehorse births
Racehorses bred in Australia
Racehorses trained in Australia